Saunulu is a village in Tehoru district, Central Maluku Regency in Maluku Province, Indonesia. Its population in 2010 was 1172.

Climate
Saunulu has a cold subtropical highland climate (Cfb) with heavy rainfall year-round.

References

Populated places in Maluku (province)